Tharptown (Uniontown) is a census-designated place located in Coal Township, Northumberland County in the state of Pennsylvania.  The community is located just to the north of the city of Shamokin.  As of the 2020 census the population was 487 residents.

References

Census-designated places in Northumberland County, Pennsylvania
Census-designated places in Pennsylvania